Tarore ( – 18 October 1836) was a Christian martyr and child prodigy. Her story is treasured by the New Zealand church as an example of forgiveness after her father chose not seek revenge against her killers following her death, and her gospel book was key to the spread of Christianity amongst Māori.

Ministry
In April 1835, a mission station was opened in Matamata by Reverend Alfred Brown and his wife, Charlotte, for the Church Missionary Society. 

In 1836, Tarore was given an early Māori language copy of the Gospel of Luke, and from the book, Charlotte Brown taught Tarore to read. Because of her ability to memorise much of the gospel, Tarore was considered a prodigy. She would recite portions of the gospel to crowds of 200–300 of her people and was supported by her father as a lay evangelist.

Murder
In October 1836, Tarore was evacuated with the other pupils from her Church Missionary Society school in Matamata, because of a violent and cannibalistic conflict between iwi. She took her father's rare Māori Gospel of Luke in a small  (basket) she wore around her neck. Whilst stopped for the night of 18 October near the Wairere Falls in the Kaimai Ranges, her party of 24, including her peace-loving father, was attacked by a Ngāti Whakaue war party from Rotorua, Tārore was murdered and the book stolen by warrior Paora Te Uita. Her ritualistically mutilated body was carried back to the Matamata mission station and was given a Christian burial. The Māori law of  required revenge for her death, but at her  (funeral) her Christian father spoke words of forgiveness and said "do not rise up to obtain satisfaction for her. God will do that."

Aftermath

Several weeks later, back in Rotorua, Uita asked visiting ex-slave, mission school educated Ripahau (also known as Matahau) of Ngāti Awa to explain the book to him. This led him to become a Christian and to ask for forgiveness from Ngākuku, leading to their reconciliation. The book, identified by Ngākuku's inscribed name, was then taken south and ended up in the hands of Ripahau again in Ōtaki. It continued to play a key role in Māori evangelising to Māori for years to come, including the introduction of the gospel to the South Island for the first time.

Legacy
Tarore's grave was located in 1976 at the Matamata  (fortification) site near the village of Waharoa, and the following year a white cross headstone and plaque were created to commemorate her death, her father's forgiveness and the spread of Christianity through New Zealand that was influenced by her book.

In 1997, The Legend of Tarore documentary was broadcast on New Zealand national television.

In 2009, Joy Cowley and Mary Clover Bibby wrote the children's book, Tārore and her Book. The same year, the Churches Education Commission gave 240,000 free copies of the book to New Zealand primary schools because of its historical significance to both Māori and Christianity in New Zealand.

Tarore's story has been described as "the iconic narrative of the early missionary period" in New Zealand. The Archbishop of Canterbury's Representative to the Holy See, Sir David Moxon described Tarore's story and gospel book as "amongst the taonga (treasures) of the Church in Aotearoa".

Notes

References

See also
Wiremu Kīngi Maketū

Ngāti Hauā people
1836 deaths
Converts to Christianity from pagan religions
New Zealand Māori women
19th-century New Zealand women
New Zealand Christians
19th-century Christian martyrs
Murdered New Zealand children